Vista Field  was a public use airport in the northwest United States, located in Benton County, Washington.
It was also known as Vista Field Airport.

Several shipping carriers operated out of the airport. There had been controversy in recent years over whether or not to continue to operate the airport or to shut it down; it was officially closed on December 31, 2013, due to operating costs. The Port of Kennewick plans to redevelop the  site into a mixed-use residential and commercial neighborhood with parks and plazas.

During World War II in the 1940s, it was an auxiliary field for nearby Naval Air Station Pasco, training naval aviators.

The Toyota Center arena, opened in 1988 as the Tri-Cities Coliseum, is adjacent to the northwest.

Facilities and aircraft 

For the 12-month period ending June 30, 2007, the airport had 45,000 general aviation aircraft operations, an average of 123 per day. At that time there were 35 aircraft based at this airport: 86% single-engine, 11% multi-engine and 3% helicopter.

References

External links 
 Vista Field at WSDOT Pilot's Guide
 , more information from WSDOT
 

Defunct airports in Washington (state)
Transportation buildings and structures in Benton County, Washington
Tri-Cities, Washington
Kennewick, Washington
Airfields of the United States Navy
Military installations closed in the 1940s
2013 disestablishments in Washington (state)
Closed installations of the United States Navy